North Sutton is an unincorporated community in the town of Sutton in Merrimack County, New Hampshire, United States. It is located at the eastern end of Kezar Lake, adjacent to Wadleigh State Park.

New Hampshire Route 114 passes through the village, leading north to New London and south to Sutton Village, South Sutton and Bradford. Interstate 89 passes just east of the village, which can be accessed from Exit 10.

North Sutton has a separate ZIP code (03260) from other parts of the town of Sutton.

Sites of interest
Kezar Lake, with its  loop of lightly traveled country roads, is a popular local destination for walkers, joggers, and dog walkers.

References

Unincorporated communities in Merrimack County, New Hampshire
Unincorporated communities in New Hampshire
Sutton, New Hampshire